Kjetil Norland (born 20 April 1978) is a retired Norwegian football striker.

He got one Norwegian Premier League game for SK Brann in 2000. In the second half of the 2001 season he was loaned out to Nest-Sotra. After the season, he joined Nest-Sotra permanently. He later joined Sandnes Ulf, and was a top goalscorer at the club. Ahead of the 2007 season he joined IL Havørn. He left halfway in the 2008 season. He resides in Florvåg.

References

1978 births
Living people
Norwegian footballers
SK Brann players
Sandnes Ulf players
Nest-Sotra Fotball players
Eliteserien players

Association football forwards